Simon McIntyre is an English rugby union prop forward.

Born in Manchester, he joined his local club, Broughton Park RUFC, at the age of eight, and later represented England at U18 level.

McIntyre started his professional career at Sale Sharks in 2009 as an academy player, appearing in five matches in the Aviva Premiership, Amlin Challenge Cup and LV=Cup.

He signed for Wasps in 2011, making ten Premiership appearances in his first season. He played in the Wasps sides that reached the semi-finals of the 2015-16 European Rugby Champions Cup and finished Premiership runners-up in 2016-17 and 2019-20.

On 28 July 2021 Sale Sharks announced that he had re-signed with them on a one year contract for the 2021/22 season During his decade at Wasps, McIntyre had played in 184 matches and was an enduringly popular player with the fans. On his departure the Coventry Telegraph described him as 'a club legend'. 

In his early career McIntyre was primarily a tight-head prop, and while he retains the ability to anchor the scrum from No.3, his career really took off when he made the switch to loose-head. In addition to his solid set-piece skills, he is widely admired for his mobility in the loose as well as his useful turn of pace and good footwork.

He is the nephew of former England footballer Brian Deane.

References 

1991 births
Living people
English rugby union players
Rugby union players from Manchester
Rugby union props
Sale Sharks players
Wasps RFC players